Bobby Leon Scales (born October 4, 1977) is an American former professional baseball second baseman. A switch hitter who throws right-handed, Scales played for the University of Michigan and was selected by the San Diego Padres in the 14th round (442nd overall) of the 1999 Major League Baseball Draft on June 11, 1999.  While at Michigan, he played for the Corvallis Knights in the West Coast League, an independent summer collegiate league. He played in Major League Baseball (MLB) for the Chicago Cubs and in Nippon Professional Baseball (NPB) for the Hokkaido Nippon-Ham Fighters and the Orix Buffaloes.

Playing career

Minor league career
Within 3 years of being drafted by the Padres organization, Scales was discouraged from lack of play and even planned to quit; but infield coach Tony Franklin talked him into staying. That same season when Bernie Castro, the top prospect starting ahead of Scales got injured, he finally got his chance to start. Signed by the Philadelphia Phillies to a minor league contract on January 11, 2006, Scales played the 2006 season with the Scranton/Wilkes-Barre Red Barons. The Boston Red Sox organization signed him to a minor league contract on December 20, 2006, and invited him to participate in the Red Sox' 2007 Spring Training. In , Scales played for the Chicago Cubs organization and became a free agent at the end of the season. In January , he re-signed with the Cubs.

Major league career

He was called up to the Cubs major league team on May 4, 2009, after starting pitcher Carlos Zambrano was put on the 15-Day Disabled List. He made his Major League debut, starting at second base, at the age of 31 on May 5 against the San Francisco Giants, a game in which he recorded his first Major League hit against Tim Lincecum, winner of the 2008 National League Cy Young Award.  He scored his first Major League run later that inning when Sean Marshall singled. On May 8, 2009, Scales hit his first Major League triple off of Dave Bush. On May 12, 2009, Scales hit his first major league home run off of Edwin Moreno of the San Diego Padres. On May 14, to further his case to stay in the bigs, Scales hit 2 doubles while driving in 4 runs in the Cubs' win over the Padres. He recorded a 6-game hit streak immediately after being called up, but that streak was lost on May 16. However, that same game, he scored the winning run in the bottom of the 9th inning against the Houston Astros. On May 27, Aaron Miles was placed on the DL, and the team needed someone who could play backup shortstop and Scales was sent down to AAA Iowa Cubs. The next day, May 28, Scales was recalled from AAA Iowa because Ryan Freel was placed on the disabled list. Scales then went on to hit a pinch hit home run in the bottom of the 8th off Dodgers pitcher Randy Wolf.

Japan
Scales signed with the Hokkaido Nippon-Ham Fighters of Nippon Professional Baseball in Japan on June 27, 2011.

Return to Cubs
On January 27, 2012, Scales signed a minor league contract with the Chicago Cubs.

New York Mets
After leaving the Cubs, Scales signed a minor league contract with the New York Mets on April 1. On May 12 he was released by the Mets.

Japan again
After his departure from the Mets organization he signed with the Orix Buffaloes.

Post-playing career
On November 9, 2012, Scales was hired to be the Los Angeles Angels of Anaheim' director of player development.

Scales was hired by the Pittsburgh Pirates to be the organization's assistant fielding coordinator in 2019.

In 2023 Scales was hired as a part-time analyst for road games on the Detroit Tigers Radio Network.

Personal life
Bobby's wife Monica has a doctorate in health communication. In 2005 Scales was named the Portland Beavers Community Player of the Year which highlighted the time and effort he put into helping the greater Portland community. He also is a substitute teacher at Milton High School in Alpharetta, Georgia during the offseason.

References

External links

1977 births
Living people
20th-century African-American sportspeople
21st-century African-American sportspeople
African-American baseball players
American expatriate baseball players in Japan
Buffalo Bisons (minor league) players
Chicago Cubs players
Detroit Tigers announcers
Fort Wayne Wizards players
Hokkaido Nippon-Ham Fighters players
Idaho Falls Braves players
Iowa Cubs players
Lake Elsinore Storm players
Major League Baseball broadcasters
Michigan Wolverines baseball players
Mobile BayBears players
Orix Buffaloes players
Pawtucket Red Sox players
Portland Beavers players
Scranton/Wilkes-Barre Red Barons players
Sportspeople from Southfield, Michigan